Arizona's 7th congressional district is a congressional district located in the U.S. state of Arizona. The district stretches along the Mexico–United States border and includes the western third of Tucson, parts of Yuma and Nogales, as well as Avondale and Tolleson in Metro Phoenix. It is currently represented by Democrat Raúl Grijalva.

History

2003–2013
Arizona picked up a seventh district after the 2000 census. Situated in the southwestern part of the state, it included all of Yuma County and parts of La Paz, Maricopa, Pima, Pinal, and Santa Cruz counties. For all intents and purposes, it was the successor to what had been the 2nd district—the former seat of longtime congressman Mo Udall–from 1951 to 2003.

The district was larger than Rhode Island, Delaware, Hawaii, Connecticut and New Jersey combined. It included 300 miles of the U.S. border with Mexico. It was home to seven sovereign Native American nations: the Ak-Chin Indian Community, Cocopah, Colorado River Indian Tribes, Gila River Indian Community, Pascua Yaqui Tribe, Quechan, and Tohono O'odham.

2013–2023
After the 2010 census, the old 7th district essentially became the 3rd district, while the 7th was redrawn to take in most of the old 4th district.

2023–Present 
Arizona's 7th district was redrawn to include much of the old 3rd congressional district, and is located within Pima, Yuma, La Paz, and Maricopa counties

Voting

List of members representing the district 
Arizona began sending a seventh member to the House after the 2000 Census.

Election results 
The district was first created in 2002 following results from the 2000 U.S. Census.

2002

2004

2006

2008

2010

2012

2014

2016

2018

2020

2022

See also

 Arizona's congressional districts
 List of United States congressional districts

References
Specific

General
 Demographic information at census.gov
 2004 Election data at CNN.com
 2002 Election data from CBSNews.com
 CQ Politics CQ 2008 Election Guide U.S. House, Arizona – 7th District

External links
 Maps of Congressional Districts first in effect for the 2002 election
 Tentative Final Congressional Maps for the 2012 election
 

07
Government of Maricopa County, Arizona
Glendale, Arizona
Government of Phoenix, Arizona
Constituencies established in 2003
2003 establishments in Arizona